The Road Transport Authority of Myanmar is part of that country's Ministry of Rail Transportation. It was founded in 1959 as the Naypyidaw Transport Company. In 1962, it became Burma Economic Development Corporation (BEDC). In 1963 it changed to Road Transport Group. In 1972 it changed its name to Road Transport Corporation, and in 1989 it became Road Transport Authority under the Ministry of Railroad Transport.

Passenger fees

Yangon to/from Taungoo: K5300
Yangon to/from Meiktila: K6400
Yangon to/from Naypyidaw: K3500
Yangon to/from Nyaung U: K7000
Yangon to/from Yaynang Chaung: K2250 / K6300
Yangon to/from Myin Chan: K5800
Yangon to/from Monywa: K8000
Mandalay to/from Na Bu Aing: K1000
Mawlamyine to/from Kyaikkami: K800
Mawlamyine to/from Thanpyuzayat: K650

Ordinary Good Transport
K55 to K330+

Fleet
Daewoo Bus
Dongfeng Bus
Ankai Bus
Mercedes-Benz Bus
Hino Truck
HOWO Truck
Shacman Truck

External links

Government agencies of Myanmar
Roads in Myanmar
Road authorities